Delpha Andersen Baird (née Andersen; December 13, 1930), was an American politician who was a Republican member of the Utah State Senate.

Baird defeated incumbent Lorin Pace in the 1990 Republican primary and was elected to the Utah State Senate for the 9th district. She was known for being an advocate for child/youth issues and  served as Chairwoman of the Judiciary Committee. Baird was defeated by L. Stephen Poulton in a 1994 primary. She has nine children and 43 grandchildren.

References

1930 births
Living people
Republican Party Utah state senators
Women state legislators in Utah
People from Brigham City, Utah
20th-century American women politicians
20th-century American politicians
21st-century American women